Jerry Frissen (born Thierry Frissen in Brussels, on June 2, 1964) is an American comic book writer and a toy designer from Los Angeles, California. He has written the anthology comic book series Lucha Libre, The Zombies That Ate The World illustrated by Guy Davis and "The Metabarons", illustrated by Valentin Secher, Niko Henrichon and Esad Ribic.

Bibliography
In English
 Pin-Up Girls From Around the World (with Fred Beltran and Ian Sattler), 2002, Humanoids Publishing
 Lucha Libre #1: Introducing The Luchadores Five, Image Comics
 Lucha Libre #2: ¡Se Llama Tequila!, Image Comics
 Lucha Libre #3: Hele Mei Hoohiwahiwa, Image Comics
 Lucha Libre #4: I Wanna Be Your Luchadorito, Image Comics
 Lucha Libre #5: Diablo Loco Is Missing, Image Comics
 Lucha Libre #6: Etiquette Essentials For Success, Image Comics
 The Zombies That Ate The World 8 issues limited series, Devil's Due
 World War X #1: Helius, Titan Comics
in French
 Meurtres (avec Jean-Luc Cornette), 1995, Niffle-Cohen
 Pin-Up Girls (with Fred Beltran and Ian Sattler), 2002, Les Humanoïdes Associés
 Les Zombies qui ont mangé le monde, tome 1: Une odeur épouvantable, June 2004, Les Humanoïdes Associés
 Lucien, 25 piges, octobre 2004, Les Humanoïdes Associés
 Les Zombies qui ont mangé le monde, tome 2: Esclaves de l'amour, January 2005, Les Humanoïdes Associés
 Les Zombies qui ont mangé le monde, tome 3: Popypop a disparu, January 2006, Les Humanoïdes Associés
 Lucha Libre #1: Introducing The Luchadores Five, August 2006, Les Humanoïdes Associés
 Lucha Libre #2: ¡Se Llama Tequila!, October 2006, Les Humanoïdes Associés
 Lucha Libre #3: Hele Mei Hoohiwahiwa: Les Tikitis, January 2007, Les Humanoïdes Associés
 Lucha Libre #4: I Wanna Be Your Luchadorito, May 2007, Les Humanoïdes Associés
 Lucha Libre #5: Diablo Loco a disparu, September 2007, Les Humanoïdes Associés
 Les Zombies qui ont mangé le monde, tome 4: La Guerre des papes, January 2008, Les Humanoïdes Associés
 Lucha Libre #6: Traité de savoir-vivre, January 2008, Les Humanoïdes Associés
 Lucha Libre #7: On dirait le sud, April 2008, Les Humanoïdes Associés
 Luuna: Sur les traces de Luuna, June 2008, Soleil Productions
 Lucha Libre #8: Pop culture mythologique, August 2008, Les Humanoïdes Associés
 Luchadores Five #1: La Cité des hommes brisés, August 2008, Les Humanoïdes Associés
 Les Tikitis #1: La Guerre des cerveaux, September 2008, Les Humanoïdes Associés
 Tequila #1: Les Épines de la destruction, October 2008, Les Humanoïdes Associés
 Lucha Libre #9: Cathéchisme, November 2008, Les Humanoïdes Associés
 Lucha Libre #10: Surfin' USA, March 2009, Les Humanoïdes Associés
 Luchadores Five #2: Lucha Beach Party, March 2009, Les Humanoïdes Associés
 Les Tikitis #2: L'Aventure de l'inventif, April 2009, Les Humanoïdes Associés
 Tequila #2: Tant pis pour le sud, May 2008, Les Humanoïdes Associés
 Tequila #2: Tant pis pour le sud, May 2008, réédition, Les Humanoïdes Associés

Awards
Frissen was nominated for the 2008 "Best Humor Publication" Eisner Award.

Notes

References

 
 
 Jerry Frissen at Bedetheque 

Living people
Writers from Los Angeles
Toy designers
1964 births
American comics writers